Houdek may refer to:

 Houdek (soil), a type of soil
 Houdek (surname)